A. Narayanan is the Founder and President of Samathuva Makkal Kazhagam, a Political Party in Tamilnadu. He is an incumbent member of the Tamil Nadu Legislative Assembly from the Nanguneri constituency. He represented the All India Anna Dravida Munnetra Kazhagam party in 2011 and won in Nanguneri District. He is also the Managing Director of Sri Mangalam Finance, Hotel Chennai Deluxe, Apple Residency and Chennai Le Palace.

References 

Members of the Tamil Nadu Legislative Assembly
Dravida Munnetra Kazhagam politicians
Living people
Year of birth missing (living people)
All India Anna Dravida Munnetra Kazhagam politicians